Marin Tudorache (born 1 April 1968) is a Romanian former footballer who played as a midfielder mainly for Jiul Petroșani, but also for teams such as Minerul Lupeni or Rapid București. Born in Petroșani, Tudorache spent almost all his career as a player at Jiul, but he was needed to retire at 30 years due to medical problems. After retirement he was dedicated as a manager for the same club. Tudorache was the manager of Jiul at all the levels, from Liga I to Liga IV and youth level. A part of Jiul, Tudorache managed Minerul Lupeni, Arieșul Turda and Energeticianul at the level of the second tier.

His son, Vlad Tudorache, is also a footballer.

Honours

Player
Jiul Petroșani
Divizia B: Winner (2) 1988–89, 1995–96

References

External links
 
 
 

1968 births
Living people
People from Petroșani
Romanian footballers
Association football midfielders
Liga I players
Liga II players
CSM Jiul Petroșani players
CS Minerul Lupeni players
FC Rapid București players
Romanian football managers
CSM Jiul Petroșani managers
ACS Viitorul Târgu Jiu managers